The Mediumwave Transmitter Bremen was the mediumwave broadcasting facility of Radio Bremen situated at Bremen-Oberneuland, Germany. It operated at 936 kHz, with a transmitter output power of 50 kW. The transmitter at Bremen-Oberneuland was built in 1999 as a replacement for the old transmission facility of Radio Bremen at Leher Feld, which was demolished to make room for an industrial area.

History 
The transmitter station was built when Radio Bremen was established in 1950. Founded by an US-American donation on October 15, 1951, the 20 kW of Radio Bremen Radio Bremen at Leher Feld got on air. To avoid of interferences with a transmitter in Tirana on the same frequency the direction to manteld to south-east was manteled. In 1999 the new, but smaller transmitter close to the Wümme bog grassland was built.

The mediumwave transmitter Bremen was the only transmitter owned by Radio Bremen — all other transmitters now used by Radio Bremen are the property of Deutsche Telekom — used a cage aerial, mounted on a 45-metre (146 feet) high, grounded, guyed lattice steel mast. This aerial had a high gain of 4.5 dB, which means that the 50 kW transmitter feeding it produced the same effect as a 140 kW transmitter feeding an antenna with a gain of 1 dB.

The broadcasts from this transmitter reached all northern Germany during daylight, except the most eastern areas. At night it covered all of Europe, although a transmitter operating at the same frequency in Lviv, Ukraine often interfered with it. In 2006 the aerial mast got a new coat of paint.

Due to financial difficulties, Radio Bremen switched off the transmitter in March 2010 "temporarily" and dismantled it in 2014 after only 200 people voiced their protest.

See also 
 List of masts
 Germany

References

External links 
 
 Aerial comparison
 https://web.archive.org/web/20070202131616/http://www.asamnet.de/~bienerhj/0936.html

Former radio masts and towers
Radio masts and towers in Germany
Buildings and structures in Bremen (city)
1999 establishments in Germany
Towers completed in 1999
2014 disestablishments in Germany
Buildings and structures demolished in 2014